Yakkasaray is one of 12 districts (tuman) of Tashkent, the capital of Uzbekistan.

Overview
Yakkasaray is one of the most central districts of the city, and the smallest in area. It was established on August 26, 1936, with the name of Frunze, referring to the Kyrgyz Bolshevik leader Mikhail Frunze. On May 8, 1992, Frunze became Yakkasaray District. 

Yakkasaray borders with the districts of Chilanzar, Shayxontoxur, Yunusabad, Mirobod and Sergeli.

References

External links

Map of Yakkasaray (from Uz.wiki)

Districts of Tashkent
Populated places established in 1981
1981 establishments in the Soviet Union